Schubert's Dream of Spring is a 1931 German musical film directed by Richard Oswald and starring Carl Jöken, Gretl Theimer and Alfred Läutner. It was shot at the Halensee Studios in Berlin with sets designed by the art director Franz Schroedter. It is a biopic of the Austrian composer Franz Schubert (1797–1828). It was one of two films along with Vienna, City of Song (1930) with which the director paid musical tribute to his native city Vienna.

Cast

References

Bibliography

External links

Schuberts Frühlingstraum, filmportal.de (in German)

1931 films
1930s historical musical films
1930s biographical films
German historical musical films
German biographical films
Films of the Weimar Republic
1930s German-language films
Films directed by Richard Oswald
Operetta films
Films set in Austria
Films set in Vienna
Films set in the 1820s
Cultural depictions of Franz Schubert
Films about composers
German black-and-white films
1930s German films
Films shot at Halensee Studios